Corsocasis is a genus of moths in the family Schreckensteiniidae. The species of this genus are found in South-East Asia.

Species
Corsocasis coronias  Meyrick, 1912 (from Japan and Taiwan)
Corsocasis cryptosema  Meyrick, 1929
Corsocasis gastrozona  Meyrick, 1932

References

Schreckensteinioidea
Moth genera